Rovers Football Club may refer to:

 Rovers Football Club (1949-), a football club competing in the Central Australian Football League
 Rovers Football Club (1882-1899), a defunct football club from Western Australia (competed in West Australian Football League)
 Rover Football Club (1882), a defunct football club from Queensland (competed in Queensland Football Association (1880-1890))

See also
 Rovers FC (disambiguation)
 Rovers § Sports